Babaeng Hampaslupa (International Name: The Poor Heiress /) is a 2011 soap opera aired in the Philippines by TV5 and starred Susan Roces along with Alice Dixson and Alex Gonzaga and is directed by Eric Quizon and Joyce Bernal.

The timeslot was changed through the April 2011 season to 9pm the original time the series was normally shown was 8:30pm and moved up to 9:00-9:30pm after its primetime suspense series Mga Nagbabagang Bulaklak on its primetime block.

A rerun of Babaeng Hampaslupa started airing on March 2, 2020 on The 5 Network occupying the 9:30PM to 11:30PM time slot every Monday to Friday, with replays from 2:30PM to 4:30PM, currently replace Enchanted Garden and Kidlat on 2:30PM and Misibis Bay on 9:30PM

Story
Babaeng Hampaslupa tells the story of two clans, the Wongs and the Sees. A modern-day fairytale set on the boundaries between the Filipino and Chinese community.

Three generations of women tell a story and cope in the inner strength in the eyes of their faiths looking for love, respect, power, and self happiness.

The story also chronicles on lost loves between Helena See (Susan Roces) and George Wong (Freddie Webb) and the powerful manipulative Edward Wong (Eddie Garcia). The soap also shows flashbacks of young Helena See (Sheryl Cruz) with the Wong brothers, young George Wong (Mico Palanca) and young Edward Wong (Bernard Palanca).

The powerful love between Anastacia See/Diana Wong (Alice Dixson) and Charles Wong (Jay Manalo) and the vindictive Katarina Manansala Wong (Bing Loyzaga), Charles' manipulative wife turned ex in his perspective and Harry Bautista (Wendell Ramos), the newfound love in Anastacia/Diana's life.

And the eternal love between Grace/Elizabeth (Alex Gonzaga) whose life eternally unfolds in her fate, as she will learn betrayal and love between Nato (Alwyn Uytingco) and Andrew (Martin Escudero).

But between all their trials and tribulations they will face, who will they truly love and be with in the end of all their success?

Cast

Main cast
Alex Gonzaga as Grace Mallari / Elizabeth Wong / Grace Elizabeth Wong / Grace Elizabeth Wong See
Susan Roces as Helena See / Helena See Wong
Alice Dixson as Diana Wong / Anastacia See

Supporting cast
Freddie Webb as George Wong
Eddie Garcia as Edward Wong
Jay Manalo as Charles Wong
Bing Loyzaga as Katarina Wong / Katarina Manansala
Martin Escudero as Andrew See
Alwyn Uytingco as Renato "Nato" Ramirez
Karel Marquez as Stephanie Manansala / Elizabeth Wong (impostor)
Christian Vasquez as William Wong
Shiela Marie Rodriguez as Margaret Wong
Marita Zobel as Elizabeth Wong
Celso Ad. Castillo as Master Ming
Susan Africa as Epiphania "Epang" Mallari
Anne Villegas as Dora
Julio Diaz as Tomas Mallari
Jenny Quizon as Josephine Perez
Dolphy Jr. as Manuel Ramirez
Piper Mishalucha as Yvonne

Extended cast
Wendell Ramos as Harry Bautista
Eric Quizon as Atty. Jefferson Go
Carlos Morales as Jong Delos Santos
Joross Gamboa as Phillip Cheng

Special participation
Sheryl Cruz as young Helena See
Bernard Palanca  as young Edward Wong
Mico Palanca as young George Wong

Characters

Wong family
Grace Mallari/Elizabeth Wong/Grace Elizabeth Wong
George Wong
Edward Wong
Charles Wong
Katarina Wong / Katarina Manansala
Stephanie / Elizabeth Wong (impostor)
William Wong
Margaret Wong
Elizabeth Wong (George Wong's first child from first wife)

See family
Helena See
Diana Wong/Anastacia See
Andrew See

Soundtrack
The following song is the main song in the series:
"Ikaw Lang ang Mamahalin" - Babaeng Hampaslupa's official theme, performed by Faith Cuneta.
Dubbed to be the best series ever that TV5 produced and the first teledrama offering in the first quarter of 2011.
This series is shot at the Hwa Chong Temple in Malabon, Philippines.

Syndication
 Philippines: Fox Filipino

International broadcast

See also
List of programs broadcast by TV5 (Philippines)
List of shows previously aired by TV5

References

External links

2011 Philippine television series debuts
2011 Philippine television series endings
Filipino-language television shows
Philippine drama television series
TV5 (Philippine TV network) drama series